Acinetobacter junii is a species of bacteria. Its type strain is ATCC 17908. It can be pathogenic. This bacterium has been linked to nosocomial infections including catheter-related blood stream infections and cellulitis.

References

Further reading

External links

Type strain of Acinetobacter junii at BacDive -  the Bacterial Diversity Metadatabase

Moraxellaceae
Bacteria described in 1986